Mickey Blue Eyes is a 1999 romantic comedy crime film directed by Kelly Makin. Hugh Grant stars as Michael Felgate, an English auctioneer living in New York City who becomes entangled in his soon-to-be father-in-law's mafia connections. Several of the minor roles are played by actors later featured in The Sopranos.

The film's title comes from Michael being forced to impersonate a gangster, who is spontaneously named "Kansas City Little Big Mickey Blue Eyes"; coincidentally, it is also a play on "Jimmy Blue Eyes," nickname of real-life mobster Vincent Alo. Later on, the film served as an inspiration for 2007 Bollywood film Welcome.

The film was released on August 20, 1999. It received mixed reviews from critics and grossed $57 million against its $20 million budget.

Plot
Michael Felgate is an English auctioneer living in New York City where he manages the Cromwell auction house. He proposes marriage to his girlfriend Gina Vitale, but is disheartened to be turned down. Gina tearfully explains that her father Frank and most of her cousins and uncles are gangsters deeply involved in a Mafia crime family, and she is concerned that Michael will be forced into their world. Michael assures her that he will not let this happen, but barely is their engagement party over before he is unwittingly involved in a money laundering scam, and soon the FBI takes an interest in him.

When one of the money laundering scams at Michael's auction house goes wrong, Gina's cousin Johnny confronts and attacks Michael. Gina takes his gun and fires a warning shot into the ceiling, which ricochets and accidentally kills Johnny. Johnny's father Vito finds out, and he tells Frank he will kill Gina unless Frank kills Michael during his wedding speech. Having grown fond of Michael, Frank confesses what Vito has ordered him to do to Michael and the two of them turn to the FBI in return for protection. The FBI set up an elaborate operation in which Michael's execution will be faked at the wedding reception. Michael is given a hidden recording device and is tasked with trying to record Vito into admitting his criminal activity on tape before he is "executed".

Michael's plan fails, and when Vito realises that his execution is a set-up, he orders Vinnie to kill Michael. Vinnie shoots Gina in what appears to be an accident. Vito is arrested for ordering Michael's execution. As Frank and Michael mourn Gina's apparent death in the back of her ambulance, it is revealed that her death was faked as well, and that Vinnie and Gina were also involved with the FBI as a back-up plan.

Cast

Production 
On November 4, 1997, Hugh Grant was announced as a cast member of the film.

The film was originally set to be released internationally by PolyGram Filmed Entertainment, through a financing agreement with one of the film's producers Castle Rock Entertainment, but it ended up being released by Universal Pictures International instead. This is one of a handful of films, and among the last, until 2007, to be self-released by Universal internationally, and shortly afterwards, the theatrical distribution arm was merged into United International Pictures.

Reception

Box office 
The film earned $10.2 million in its opening weekend. It went on to gross $33.9 million in the United States and a total of $54.3 million worldwide. According to the Los Angeles Times the film was a "marginal money loser".

Critical response 
On Rotten Tomatoes, the film holds an approval rating of 45% based on 78 reviews, with an average rating of 5.3/10. The site's critics consensus states: "High-brow humorists doing low-brow humor never hit their stride." At Metacritic, the film has a weighted average score of 49 out of 100, based on 30 critics, indicating "generally favorable reviews". Audiences polled by CinemaScore gave the film an average grade of "B−" on an A+ to F scale.

Links to The Sopranos
The film is notable for the number of actors who would go on to appear in the HBO TV series, The Sopranos, including:

 Tony Sirico - Paulie Gualtieri
 John Ventimiglia - Artie Bucco
 Vincent Pastore - Sal "Big Pussy" Bonpensiero
 Aida Turturro - Janice Soprano
 Frank Pellegrino - Bureau Chief Frank Cubitoso
 Joseph R. Gannascoli - Vito Spatafore
 Burt Young - Robert "Bobby" Baccalieri, Sr.
 Tony Darrow - Lawrence "Larry Boy" Barese
 Melissa Marsala - Kelly Aprile

The film is mentioned in the season 2 Sopranos episode "D-Girl", when Amy Safir explains to Christopher Moltisanti that there isn't a demand for mob-related scripts because of this film.

See also
 Vincent Alo, a real-life gangster known as "Jimmy Blue Eyes"

References

External links
 
 
 
 
 
 
 

1999 films
1990s crime comedy films
1999 romantic comedy films
British crime comedy films
British romantic comedy films
American crime comedy films
American romantic comedy films
1990s English-language films
Films about the American Mafia
Films scored by Basil Poledouris
Films set in New York City
Films shot in New York City
Mafia comedy films
Castle Rock Entertainment films
Universal Pictures films
Warner Bros. films
Films directed by Kelly Makin
1990s American films
1990s British films